Ibomcha is an Indian surname. Notable people with the surname include:

K. Ibomcha Sharma, Indian singer
L Ibomcha Singh, Indian boxing coach
Laisom Ibomcha Singh, Indian politician

Surnames of Indian origin
Indian surnames